The 2015 PGA Tour Canada, titled as the 2015 Mackenzie Tour – PGA Tour Canada for sponsorship reasons, ran from May 28 to September 20 and consisted of 12 official tournaments. This was the 46th season of PGA Tour Canada (previously known as the Canadian Professional Golf Tour), and the third under the "PGA Tour Canada" name. It is also the first under the "Mackenzie Tour - PGA Tour Canada" name after Mackenzie Investments signed a six-year sponsorship deal. The purse for most events increased from $150,000 to $175,000. All 12 events returned from the 2014 schedule.

The increased prize money also meant that first place earns $31,500, compared to $27,000 the previous season. The final event of the season, the Freedom 55 Financial Championship, had a purse of $200,000, with $36,000 going to the winner.

Schedule
The following table lists official events during the 2015 season.

Order of Merit
The Order of Merit was based on prize money won during the season, calculated in Canadian dollars. The top five players on the tour earned status to play on the 2016 Web.com Tour.

Notes

References

External links
PGA Tour Canada official site

PGA Tour Canada
PGA Tour Canada